Charles Saxton (born November 7, 1989, in Bristol, Pennsylvania) is an American film, television and voice actor.

He had a supporting role as Bug, one of the band members, in Bandslam. He was featured in Hung, an HBO comedy-drama series, playing the son of Thomas Jane's main character. He also provided the voice of Melvin in the video game Bully. He is the voice of Toby on Guillermo del Toro's award-winning animated series, Trollhunters.

Charlie also stars as the wrestler "Lone Wolf" in The Wonder Years music video for Melrose Diner.

Filmography

Film

Television

Video games

References

External links

1989 births
Living people
People from Bristol, Pennsylvania
American male child actors
American male film actors
American male television actors
American male video game actors